Phantasis carinata is a species of beetle in the family Cerambycidae. It was described by Fåhraeus in 1872. It is known from South Africa.

References

Phantasini
Beetles described in 1872